Sons of All Pussys (typeset as SONS OF ALL PUSSYS, abbreviated as S.O.A.P.) was a Japanese rock band. Formed in 2002 by Ken, his former L'Arc-en-Ciel bandmate Sakura, and German born model Ein (who appeared in L'Arc-en-Ciel's PVs for "Heaven's Drive" and "Love Flies").

Members 
 Ken - vocals, guitar (L'Arc-en-Ciel)
 Ein - bass
 Sakura - drums (ex-L'Arc-en-Ciel, Zigzo, Lion Heads, Creature Creature, Rayflower, By-Sex)

Discography

Mini albums 
 Grace (February 6, 2003), Oricon Albums Chart Peak Position: 23
 Gimme a Guitar (March 26, 2003), Oricon Albums Chart Peak Position: 25
 High (November 26, 2003), Oricon Albums Chart Peak Position: 31

Singles 
 "Paradise" (July 7, 2004), Oricon Singles Chart Peak Position: 11

Videos 
 Bubble Festival 2003-Haru (October 20, 2003)
 Ichiban-Blow (October 20, 2004)
 S.S.J.B.F. in Budōkan (October 20, 2004)

References

External links 
 

Japanese alternative rock groups
Japanese musical trios
Musical groups established in 2002
2002 establishments in Japan
Musical groups from Tokyo